Mikhail Alekseyev (born 1857–1918), Imperial Russian Army general.

Mikhail Alekseyev may also refer to:

Mikhail Alekseyev (writer) (1918–2007), Russian Soviet writer and editor
Mikhail Alekseev (linguist) (1949–2014), Russian linguist
Mikhail Alekseyev (banker) (born 1964), Russian banker and chairman of the Central Bank of Russia